The large kelpfish (Chironemus marmoratus), the Eastern kelpfish, hiwihiwi, surgefish or  kelpfish, is a species of marine ray-finned fish, a kelpfish belonging to the family Chironemidae. It is found in southern Australia, and off the North Island of New Zealand, at depths down to 30 m.

Taxonomy
The large kelpfish was first formally described in 1860 by the German born British ichthyologist Albert Günther with the type locality given as the Swan River and Erub on the western coast of Australia, an error, this is outside of the known range of this species. The specific name marmoratus means “marbled” a reference to the pattern of colouration on this fish’s body.

Description
The large kelpfish has a pointed snout and a small mouth. There are 14-15 spines and 16-20 soft rays in the dorsal fin while the anal fin contains 3 spines and 6-8 soft rays. It has large pectoral fins with the upper rays being branched and the lower ones being unbranched and robust. The colour of the body can be grey, brown, green or pinkish and the head and body are covered in small white spots, with the body having large dark blotches.

Distribution and habitat
The large kelpfish is found in the southwestern Pacific Ocean. It occurs in Australia from Fraser Island in Queensland to the Gippsland Lakes in Victoria, the islands in the Bass Strait and north-eastern Tasmania, as well as Lord Howe Island in the Tasman Sea. In New Zealand it is found around the North Island, between the North Cape and East Cape. This species is found in kelp and areas with macroalgae on reefs in shallow water in area that are frequently subjected to powerful surges or waves, often being found in the intertidal zone.

Biology
The large kelpfish feeds on invertebrates, including small molluscs, crabs and sea urchins. The fertilised eggs are reportedly attached to fronds of seaweed within cavities in reefs. These fishes remain close to the seabed and continually move around the surge zone and may be found in large aggregations.

References
 
 
 Tony Ayling & Geoffrey Cox, Collins Guide to the Sea Fishes of New Zealand,  (William Collins Publishers Ltd, Auckland, New Zealand 1982) 

Chironemidae
Fish described in 1860
Taxa named by Albert Günther